Alex Stik Castro Giraldo (born 8 March 1994) is a Colombian football player who plays as winger for Nacional in Uruguay on loan from Cruz Azul.

Club career

Alianza Petrolera
Castro began his career at Alianza Petrolera, debuting on 17 October 2013 in a 1–0 Copa Colombia defeat Atlético Nacional as a 63rd minute substitute for Dairon Asprilla. He made his league debut three days later, again as a substitute, in a 2–0 defeat to Cúcuta Deportivo. Castro scored his first senior goal on 9 April 2015, the opening goal in a 2–2 league draw with La Equidad.

Deportivo Cali
In June 2017, Castro completed a transfer to Deportivo Cali. He made his debut for the team on 8 July 2017 in a 4–2 win over Envigado and appeared in a continental competition for the first a week later, in the second round of the 2017 Copa Sudamericana against Junior.

After half a season with Los Azucareros, Castro spent the next two campaigns on loan, returning to Alianza Petrolera in 2018 before another loan spell, this time to fellow Primera A team Deportes Tolima, in 2019. The loan deal contained the option to purchase Castro at the end of the season but in December 2019, Deportivo Cali released a statement announcing Tolima had declined the option. They did, however, admit that Castro's "future will be discussed" as he continued to express a desire to leave, particularly as he wanted to play abroad.

Cruz Azul
On 24 January 2020, Castro signed a three-year contract with Liga MX team Cruz Azul. On 21 January 2021, Castro returned to Colombia on a one-year loan with Atlético Nacional from Cruz Azul.

On 6 January 2021, Castro was loaned out to Uruguayan club Nacional until the end of 2022.

Career statistics

Club 
.

References

External links
 
 Alex Castro at Copa Libertadores

1994 births
Living people
Footballers from Medellín
Colombian footballers
Colombian expatriate footballers
Alianza Petrolera players
Deportivo Cali footballers
Deportes Tolima footballers
Cruz Azul footballers
Atlético Nacional footballers
Club Nacional de Football players
Categoría Primera A players
Liga MX players
Expatriate footballers in Mexico
Expatriate footballers in Uruguay
Colombian expatriate sportspeople in Mexico
Colombian expatriate sportspeople in Uruguay
Association football forwards